An orrery is a mechanical model of the Solar System that illustrates or predicts the relative positions and motions of the planets and moons, usually according to the heliocentric model. It may also represent the relative sizes of these bodies; however, since accurate scaling is often not practical due to the actual large ratio differences, a subdued approximation may be used instead. Though the Greeks had working planetaria, the first orrery that was a planetarium of the modern era was produced in 1704, and one was presented to Charles Boyle, 4th Earl of Orrery – hence the name. They are typically driven by a clockwork mechanism with a globe representing the Sun at the centre, and with a planet at the end of each of the arms.

History

Ancient versions

The Antikythera mechanism, discovered in 1901 in a wreck off the Greek island of Antikythera in the Mediterranean Sea, exhibited the diurnal motions of the Sun, Moon, and the five known planets. It has been dated between 150 and 100 BC. The Antikythera hand-driven mechanism is now considered one of the first orreries. It was geocentric and was used as a mechanical calculator to calculate astronomical positions.

According to Cicero, the Roman philosopher who was writing in the first century BC, the Greek polymath Posidonius constructed a planetary model.

Early versions

In 1348, Giovanni Dondi built the first known clock driven mechanism of the system. It displays the ecliptical position of Moon, Sun, Mercury, Venus, Mars, Jupiter and Saturn according to the complicated geocentric Ptolemaic planetary theories. The clock itself is lost, but Dondi left a complete description of its astronomic gear trains.

As late as 1650, P. Schirleus built a geocentric planetarium with the Sun as a planet, and with Mercury and Venus revolving around the Sun as its moons.

At the court of William IV, Landgrave of Hesse-Kassel two complicated astronomic clocks were built in 1561 and 1563–1568. These use four sides to show the ecliptical positions of Sun, Mercury, Venus, Mars, Jupiter, Saturn, the Moon, Sun and Dragon (Nodes of the Moon) according to Ptolemy, a calendar, the sunrise and sunset, and an automated celestial sphere with an animated Sun symbol which, for the first time on a celestial globe, shows the real position of the Sun, including the equation of time. The clocks are now on display in Kassel at the Astronomisch-Physikalisches Kabinett and in Dresden at the Mathematisch-Physikalischer Salon.

In De revolutionibus orbium coelestium, published in Nuremberg in 1543, Nicolaus Copernicus challenged the Western teaching of a geocentric universe in which the Sun revolved daily around the Earth. He observed that some Greek philosophers such as Aristarchus of Samos had proposed a heliocentric universe. This simplified the apparent epicyclic motions of the planets, making it feasible to represent the planets' paths as simple circles. This could be modeled by the use of gears. Tycho Brahe's improved instruments made precise observations of the skies (1576–1601), and from these Johannes Kepler (1621) deduced that planets orbited the Sun in ellipses. In 1687 Isaac Newton explained the cause of elliptic motion in his theory of gravitation.

Modern orreries

There is an orrery built by clock makers George Graham and Thomas Tompion dated c1710 in the History of Science Museum, Oxford. Graham gave the first model, or its design, to the celebrated instrument maker John Rowley of London to make a copy for Prince Eugene of Savoy. Rowley was commissioned to make another copy for his patron Charles Boyle, 4th Earl of Orrery, from which the device took its name in English. This model was presented to Charles' son John, later the 5th Earl of Cork and 5th Earl of Orrery. Independently, Christiaan Huygens published in 1703 details of a heliocentric planetary machine which he had built while resident in Paris between 1665 and 1681. He calculated the gear trains needed to represent a year of 365.242 days, and used that to produce the cycles of the principal planets.

Joseph Wright's painting A Philosopher giving a Lecture on the Orrery in which a lamp is put in place of the Sun (ca. 1766), which hangs in Derby Museum and Art Gallery, depicts a group listening to a lecture by a natural philosopher. The Sun in a brass orrery provides the only light in the room. The orrery depicted in the painting has rings, which give it an appearance similar to that of an armillary sphere. The demonstration was thereby able to depict eclipses.

To put this in chronological context, in 1762 John Harrison's marine chronometer first enabled accurate measurement of longitude. In 1766, astronomer Johann Daniel Titius first demonstrated that the mean distance of each planet from the Sun could be represented by the following progression:

That is, 0.4, 0.7, 1.0, 1.6, 2.8, 5.2 ... The numbers refer to astronomical units, the mean distance between Sun and Earth, which is 1.496 × 108 km (93 × 106 miles). The Derby Orrery does not show mean distance, but demonstrated the relative planetary movements.

Eisinga's Planetarium was built from 1774 to 1781 by Eise Eisinga in his home in Franeker, in the Netherlands. It displays the planets across the width of a room's ceiling, and has been in operation almost continually since it was created. This orrery is a planetarium in both senses of the word: a complex machine showing planetary orbits, and a theatre for depicting the planets' movement. Eisinga house was bought by the Dutch Royal family who gave him a pension.

In 1764, Benjamin Martin devised a new type of planetary model, in which the planets were carried on brass arms leading from a series of concentric or coaxial tubes. With this construction it was difficult to make the planets revolve, and to get the moons to turn around the planets. Martin suggested that the conventional orrery should consist of three parts: the planetarium where the planets revolved around the Sun, the tellurion (also tellurian or tellurium) which showed the inclined axis of the Earth and how it revolved around the Sun, and the lunarium which showed the eccentric rotations of the Moon around the Earth. In one orrery, these three motions could be mounted on a common table, separately using the central spindle as a prime mover.

Explanation 

All orreries are planetariums or planetaria (alternative plural). The term orrery has only existed since 1714. A grand orrery is one that includes the outer planets known at the time of its construction. The word planetarium has been captured, and now usually refers to hemispherical theatres in which images of the night sky are projected onto an overhead surface. Planetariums (orreries) can range widely in size from hand-held to room-sized. An orrery is used to demonstrate the motion of the planets, while a mechanical device used to predict eclipses and transits is called an astrarium.

An orrery should properly include the Sun, the Earth and the Moon (plus optionally other planets). A model that only includes the Earth, the Moon, and the Sun is called a tellurion or tellurium, and one which only includes the Earth and the Moon is a lunarium. A jovilabe is a model of Jupiter and its moons.

A planetarium will show the orbital period of each planet and the rotation rate, as shown in the table above. A tellurion will show the Earth with the Moon revolving around the Sun. It will use the angle of inclination of the equator from the table above to show how it rotates around its own axis. It will show the Earth's Moon, rotating around the Earth. A lunarium is designed to show the complex motions of the Moon as it revolves around the Earth.

Orreries are usually not built to scale. Human orreries, where humans move about as the planets, have also been constructed, but most are temporary. There is a permanent human orrery at Armagh Observatory in Northern Ireland, which has the six ancient planets, Ceres, and comets Halley and Encke. Uranus and beyond are also shown, but in a fairly limited way. Another is at Sky's the Limit Observatory and Nature Center in Twentynine Palms, CA.  This is a true to scale (20 billion to one), true to position (accurate to within four days) human orrery. The first four planets are relatively close to one another, but the next four require a certain amount of hiking in order to visit them. A census of all permanent Human Orreries has been initiated by the French group F-HOU with a new effort to study their impact for education in schools. A map of known Human Orreries is available.

A normal mechanical clock could be used to produce an extremely simple orrery with the Sun in the centre, Earth on the minute hand and Jupiter on the hour hand; Earth would make 12 revolutions around the Sun for every 1 revolution of Jupiter. Jupiter's actual year is 11.86 Earth years long, so this particular example would lose accuracy rapidly. A real orrery would be more accurate and include more planets, and would perhaps make the planets rotate as well.

Projection orreries

Many planetariums (buildings) have a projection orrery, which projects onto the dome of the planetarium a Sun with either dots or small images of the planets. These usually are limited to the planets from Mercury to Saturn, although some include Uranus. The light sources for the planets are projected onto mirrors which are geared to a motor which drives the images on the dome. Typically the Earth will circle the Sun in one minute, while the other planets will complete an orbit in time periods proportional to their actual motion. Thus Venus, which takes 224.7 days to orbit the Sun, will take 37 seconds to complete an orbit on an orrery, and Jupiter will take 11 minutes, 52 seconds.

Some planetariums have taken advantage of this to use orreries to simulate planets and their moons. Thus Mercury orbits the Sun in 0.24 of an Earth year, while Phobos and Deimos orbit Mars in a similar 4:1 time ratio. Planetarium operators wishing to show this have placed a red cap on the Sun (to make it resemble Mars) and turned off all the planets but Mercury and Earth. Similar tricks can be used to show Pluto and its five moons.

Notable orreries

Shoemaker John Fulton of Fenwick, Ayrshire, built three between 1823 and 1833. The last is in Glasgow's Kelvingrove Art Gallery and Museum.

The Franeker Planetarium built by a wool carder named Eise Eisinga in his own living room, in the small city of Franeker in Friesland, is in fact an orrery. It was constructed between 1774 and 1781. The "face" of the model looks down from the ceiling of a room, with most of the mechanical works in the space above the ceiling. It is driven by a pendulum clock, which has 9 weights or ponds. The planets move around the model in real time.

An innovative concept is to have people play the role of the moving planets and other Solar System objects. Such a model, called a human orrery, has been laid out with precision at the Armagh Observatory.

In popular culture

 The construction system Meccano is a popular tool for constructing highly accurate orreries. Model 391, the first Meccano Orrery, was described in the June 1918 Meccano Manual.
 In the backstory of the 1982 film The Dark Crystal, the UrSkek TekTih made a giant automatic orrery, with the help of his fellow UrSkek ShodYod, for Aughra, in the mountaintop observatory where she lives.
 In the 1999 version of Tarzan, the title character studies an orrery with planets on.
 In the 2000 science fiction film Pitch Black, an orrery was used to demonstrate a pending eclipse of the planet.
In the 2020 historical novel A Room Made of Leaves by Kate Grenville, a makeshift orrery made from scraps found in the early colony of New South Wales by the first astronomer of the colony, William Dawes, serves as the metaphor for the desire of human love in general, and the evolving fictional relationship of Elizabeth Macarthur to Dawes in particular.

See also

Apparent retrograde motion
Armillary sphere
Astrarium
Astrolabe
Astronomical clock
Clockwork universe
Eidouranion
Ephemeris
Equatorium
Eratosthenes
John Fulton (instrument maker)
List of astronomical instruments
Orbit of the Moon
Stability of the Solar System
Tellurion
Torquetum

References

External links

 JPL Solar System Simulator
 Long Now Foundation Orrery
 University of Pennsylvania Orrery

Historical scientific instruments
Astronomical instruments
Solar System models
Scale modeling
1704 in science
Science education materials